Oyggjaframi (Advancement for the Islands) was a group operating to the political left founded by Faroese students in Denmark in 1962. Later a local section was organized in Tórshavn, the capital of the Faroe Islands.

In 1969 Oyggjaframi changed name to Oyggjaframi – Føroyskir Sosialistar (Advancement for the Islands - Faroese Socialists).

Initially the group was linked to Tjóðveldisflokkurin (the Republican Party), but due to increasing communist influence in Oyggjaframi the party broke the relations with the group.

The Tórshavn section broke away to form Oyggjaframi (m-l). The remaining group was renamed Føroyskir Sosialistar (In Danish: Færøske Socialister).

FS fought for the creation of a Faroese socialist republic. FS actively struggled against NATO.

Oyggjaframi, FS published the monthly magazine Framin (Forward), which carried the subtitle Føroyskt tíðarrit fyri sosialismu og sjálvstýri (Faroese magazine for socialism and independence) between 1962 and 1984 and Roðin between 1971 and 1982.

At the World Federation of Democratic Youth General Assembly in Varna, Bulgaria in 1974 FS were accepted as members.

Defunct political parties in the Faroe Islands
Defunct socialist parties in Denmark
Youth organizations based in the Faroe Islands
Socialism in the Faroe Islands
Youth organizations established in 1962
1962 establishments in Denmark
Opposition to NATO

Secessionist organizations in Europe
Separatism in Denmark
Anti-Western sentiment
Faroese nationalism
Left-wing nationalism